Sovetsky District is the name of several administrative and municipal divisions in Russia.  The name literally means "Soviet".

Districts of the federal subjects

Sovetsky District, Altai Krai, an administrative and municipal district of Altai Krai
Sovetsky District, Republic of Crimea, an administrative and municipal district in the Republic of Crimea
Sovetsky District, Khanty-Mansi Autonomous Okrug, an administrative and municipal district of Khanty-Mansi Autonomous Okrug
Sovetsky District, Kirov Oblast, an administrative and municipal district of Kirov Oblast
Sovetsky District, Kursk Oblast, an administrative and municipal district of Kursk Oblast
Sovetsky District, Mari El Republic, an administrative and municipal district of the Mari El Republic
Sovetsky District, Rostov Oblast, an administrative and municipal district of Rostov Oblast
Sovetsky District, Saratov Oblast, an administrative and municipal district of Saratov Oblast
Sovetsky District, Stavropol Krai, an administrative and municipal district of Stavropol Krai

City divisions
Sovetsky City District, Astrakhan, a city district of Astrakhan, the administrative center of Astrakhan Oblast
Sovetsky City District, Bryansk, a city district of Bryansk, the administrative center of Bryansk Oblast
Sovetsky City District, Chelyabinsk, an administrative and municipal city district of Chelyabinsk, the administrative center of Chelyabinsk Oblast
Sovetsky City District, Ivanovo, a city district of Ivanovo, the administrative center of Ivanovo Oblast
Sovetsky City District, Kazan, a city district of Kazan, the capital of the Republic of Tatarstan
Sovetsky City District, Krasnoyarsk, a city district of Krasnoyarsk, the administrative center of Krasnoyarsk Krai
Sovetsky Territorial Okrug, a territorial okrug of the city of Lipetsk, the administrative center of Lipetsk Oblast
Sovetsky City District, Makhachkala, an administrative and municipal city district of Makhachkala, the capital of the Republic of Dagestan
Sovetsky City District, Nizhny Novgorod, a city district of Nizhny Novgorod, the administrative center of Nizhny Novgorod Oblast
Sovetsky City District, Novosibirsk, a city district of Novosibirsk, the administrative center of Novosibirsk Oblast
Sovetsky Administrative Okrug, an administrative okrug of the city of Omsk, the administrative center of Omsk Oblast
Sovetsky City District, Orsk, a city district of Orsk, a city in Orenburg Oblast
Sovetsky City District, Oryol, a city district of Oryol, the administrative center of Oryol Oblast
Sovetsky City District, Rostov-on-Don, a city district of Rostov-on-Don, the administrative center of Rostov Oblast
Sovetsky City District, Ryazan, a city district of Ryazan, the administrative center of Ryazan Oblast
Sovetsky City District, Samara, an administrative and municipal city district of Samara, the administrative center of Samara Oblast
Sovetsky City District, Tambov, a city district of Tambov, the administrative center of Tambov Oblast
Sovetsky City District, Tomsk, a city district of Tomsk, the administrative center of Tomsk Oblast
Sovetsky City District, Tula, a city district of Tula, the administrative center of Tula Oblast
Sovetsky City District, Ufa, a city district of Ufa, the capital of the Republic of Bashkortostan
Sovetsky City District, Ulan-Ude, a city district of Ulan-Ude, the capital of the Buryat Republic
Sovetsky City District, Vladivostok, a city district of Vladivostok, the administrative center of Primorsky Krai
Sovetsky City District, Volgograd, a city district of Volgograd, the administrative center of Volgograd Oblast
Sovetsky City District, Voronezh, a city district of Voronezh, the administrative center of Voronezh Oblast

Renamed districts
Sovetsky District, name of Shamilsky District of the Republic of Dagestan, until 1994
Sovetsky District, name of Chereksky District of the Kabardino-Balkar Republic, until 1994

See also
Sovetsky (disambiguation)
Sovetsky Okrug (disambiguation)
Sovetsk

References